KGF Academy (formerly known as BEML FC) is an Indian professional football club from Bangalore. Formed in 2011 went straight into professional football and got accepted into the I-League 2nd Division, the second tier of football in India.

History
KGF Academy was founded in 2011 in Bangalore. In January 2012 they were officially certified by the All India Football Federation to participate in the I-League 2nd Division, the second tier of football in India.

Players

First-team
This list of players at KGF Academy would be decided before the 2013 I-League 2nd Division season begins.

Honours
 Bangalore Super Division
Champions (1): 2011–12

See also
List of football clubs in India

References

External links
KGF Academy at Soccerway
 Logo

Football clubs in Bangalore
Association football clubs established in 2011
2011 establishments in Karnataka
I-League 2nd Division clubs